Steven Barrera (born August 17, 1993) is an American soccer player who plays as a goalkeeper for California United Strikers in the NISA.

Career

College & Amateur
Barrera began playing college soccer at California State University, Los Angeles in 2012.

Following college, Barrera played in the USL PDL, later rebranded USL League Two, in both 2018 and 2019.

Professional
In September 2019, Barrera signed for NISA side California United Strikers ahead of the league's inaugural season.

Career statistics

References

External links
 Profile at California State University, Los Angeles
 USL League Two Profile
 California United profile

1993 births
Living people
American soccer players
Association football goalkeepers
Ventura County Fusion players
Soccer players from California
USL League Two players
People from Bellflower, California
Sportspeople from Los Angeles County, California
National Independent Soccer Association players
Cal State Los Angeles Golden Eagles men's soccer players